Babylonia feicheni is a species of sea snail, a marine gastropod mollusk, in the family Babyloniidae. The average length is 55.7 millimetres.

References

feicheni
Gastropods described in 1973